Heywood Gould is an American screenwriter, journalist, novelist and film director. He has penned screenplays for the films Rolling Thunder, The Boys from Brazil, Fort Apache, The Bronx, Streets of Gold, Cocktail and directed the films One Good Cop, Trial by Jury, Mistrial and Double Bang.

Partial bibliography
Corporation Freak, Tower Books, 1971 (nonfiction account of working at IBM's Advanced Systems Development Division in 1968)

References

External links

Living people
1942 births
American male screenwriters
Screenwriters from New York (state)
Writers from the Bronx
Film directors from New York City
20th-century American screenwriters
20th-century American male writers